Qualification for the 2018 FIBA Asia Champions Cup started in 2017 and will end in 2018.

Background
Starting this year, there are a lot of changes in the qualification leading to the main tournament:

 There will be several qualifying rounds spread all across the continent, having the sub-zones scheduled their own qualifiers.
 One unique difference is some of Asia's top professional leagues will have their representatives already seeded in the Final Eight. China's Chinese Basketball Association, South Korea's Korean Basketball League, Japan's B.League and the Philippines' Philippine Basketball Association all have Direct Qualifying Spots to the Final 8.

Already qualified to the main tournament are teams from these leagues:

 Chinese Basketball Association
 Korean Basketball League
 B.League
 Philippine Basketball Association

Awaiting results are the West Asia and East Asia Final 8 Qualifiers:
 West Asia qualifier participants (will qualify two spots to the Final 8):
  Sharjah Club
  Manama Club
  Al-Arabi
  Petrochimi
  Al-Riyadi
  Sareyyet Ramallah
  TBD 
  Wild Card Team

 East Asia qualifier participants (will qualify two spots to the Final 8):
 Mono Vampire
  Pelita Jaya
  Pauian

West Asia
On March 17, 2018, Petrochimi of Iran avenged their last year's defeat against Al-Riyadi of Lebanon to rule the West Asia Basketball Association (WABA) Champions Cup qualifiers, 83-53, in the Final in Beirut, Lebanon. Joining the finalists is Sareyyet Ramallah of Palestine, which qualified by virtue of their win over Syria's Al-Jaish.

The top three teams are now qualified to the “Road To Final 8 (West Asia)” Round 1.

Southeast Asia
The FIBA Asia Champions Cup SEABA qualifier was held in Nonthaburi, Thailand from 8–10 May 2018.

The competition qualify two club teams from the SEABA sub-zone for the "Road to Final 8 (East Asia)" round of the main tournament.

The two successful SEABA club teams will join club teams from Chinese Taipei and India in the next round, which will qualify one team to the Final 8, joining the group composed of Australia, Japan and the Philippines.

Thailand's Mono Vampire, and Indonesia's Pelita Jaya have qualified for the Round 1 of the FIBA Asia Champions Cup 2018 - Road to Final 8 East Asia after finishing among the top two.

Round Robin

Gulf
The FIBA Asia Champions Cup GBA qualifier was held in Muscat, Oman from 6–14 May 2018.

The sub-zone qualifier will qualify three teams for the Round 1 of the FIBA Asia Champions Cup, which will determine the identity of the four teams in the “Road To Final 8 (West Asia)”.

Two teams from Qatar, Bahrain, United Arab Emirates and a team each from Saudi Arabia and the hosts Oman participated in the weeklong sub-zone qualifier.

Bahrain's Al Manama, UAE's Sharjah and Qatar's Al-Arabi have qualified for the Round 1 of the FIBA Asia Champions Cup 2018 - Road to Final 8 West Asia after finishing among the top three.

Preliminary round

Group A

Group B

Final round

Quarterfinals

Semifinals

Third place game

Final

Final standings

East Inter-Sub Zone qualification
South Asia will be represented by the best club team from India and they will participate in the FIBA Asia Champions Cup 2018 East Inter-Sub Zone Qualification that will be held in Thailand on 30 July.

East Asia has already three direct spots allocated to the Final 8 (China, Korea, Japan) and Taiwan's Pauian will participate in the FIBA Asia Champions Cup 2018 East Inter-Sub Zone Qualification that will be held in Thailand on 30 July.

Participating teams

  Mono Vampire
  Pelita Jaya
  Pauian

References

2018–19 in Asian basketball
FIBA Asia Champions Cup